Qaleh Gholam Abdollah (also Romanized as Qal‘eh Gholām ‘Abdollāh; also known as Gholām ‘Abdollāhī) is a village in Howmeh Rural District, in the Central District of Lamerd County, Fars Province, Iran. At the 2006 census, its population was 112, in 27 families.

References 

Populated places in Lamerd County